There are only  living individuals of the critically endangered kākāpō, a large, flightless parrot native to New Zealand. Every known living kākāpō, except some young chicks, has been given a name by officials of the Kākāpō Recovery Programme. Many of the older birds were given English-language names, but more recent chicks have been given Māori names. Some kākāpō, such as Richard Henry and Moorhouse, are named after people who have provided assistance to the preservation efforts. A kākāpō interactive family tree is available.

Recent population changes
After a good breeding year in 2002, the population remained at 86 until 2004, when three two-year-old female kākāpō died from erysipelas caused by the soil bacterium Erysipelothrix rhusiopathiae. Four chicks survived from the 2005 breeding season. The male Gunner died of aflatoxicosis during the New Zealand winter of 2005, bringing the population back to 86. In April 2008, the population grew to 93 with the hatching of seven chicks, then fell to 92 due to the death of adult Bill. One of the seven 2008 chicks died soon after hatching, bringing the total down to 91, and on 28 October 2008, male Lee died, bringing the population down to 90. Male Rangi was rediscovered in February 2009 after spending 21 years living on Codfish Island. The 2009 breeding season resulted in 33 chicks (20 male and 13 female), bringing the population up to 124. 

A number of older birds died during 2010, followed by the significant loss of the only remaining Fiordland kākāpō, Richard Henry, announced during January 2011. His Fiordland genes survive through his three progeny. The breeding season in 2011 produced 11 chicks (eight females, three male), which all survived, bringing the population to 131. However, the deaths of several birds followed and with no breeding in 2012, the population dropped to 124. The hatching of six eggs in May 2014 (the first hatchings since 2011) then increased the total population to 130 living individuals.

Forty-seven chicks hatched in the 2016 nesting season, making it a "record breeding season". As of July 2016, 34 of them had survived.

A record 71 chicks were born and raised to juvenile range in the 2018/2019 breeding season. Department of Conservation, Kākāpō operations manager Deidre Vercoe was quoted saying '"The kākāpō population has grown 70% in the last 5 years and we're starting to reach carrying capacity on the two main breeding islands: Anchor and Whenua Hou. We need to find new suitable habitats for the growing population, which is a great problem to have."

All known kakapo reside on four predator free islands Whenua Hou, Pukenui, Hauturu, Te Kakahu and Pearl Island.

Founder kākāpō in 1995 (51) 
Names marked ‡ are of birds missing, presumed dead

Names marked † are of birds deceased

The kakapo founder birds are all of the kakapo individuals that were alive in 1995; Beginning of the Kākāpō Recovery Programme.

Female 
 Alice – first captured: 1981; 
 Bella – first captured: 1982 
 Cyndy – first captured: 1987
 Flossie – first captured: by 1982
 Fuchsia – first captured: 1991; † 
 Jane – first captured 1989 †
 Jean – first captured: 1981
 Lisa – first captured: by August 1982
 Maggie – first captured: March 1980 † 
 Margaret-Maree – first captured: 1986
 Nora – first captured: 1980
 Ruth – first captured: 1991
 Sandra - first captured 1992†
 Sarah – first captured 1989†
 Solstice – first captured: 21 June 1997;
 Sue – first captured: 1983
 Suzanne – first captured 1989
 Wendy – first captured:1982
 Zephyr – hatched: 1981
Lillian- hatched 2011 
Emma- hatched 2011

Males 

 Arab – first captured in 1980 † 
 Barnard – first captured: 1982; † 
 Basil – first captured 1989
 Ben – † 
 Bill – first captured: 1982 †
 Blades – first captured 1982
 Bonus – Found in April 1984.
 Boss – first captured 1989
 Dobbie – hatched: 1991; †
 Felix – first captured: 1989; † 
 Gerry – † 
 Gumboots – first captured: 1988, † 
 Gunner –† 
 Jimmy – † 
 Joe – First captured: 1982
 Ken – first captured: 1988 † 
 Lee – † 
 Lionel – first captured: 1981 † 
 Luke – found in April 1982.
 Merv – found in January 1989.
 Nog – first captured: 1989
 Ox – first captured: 1982
 Piripi – caught in January 1990 † 
 Ralph – first captured: 1987
 Rangi – first captured: 1987
 Richard Henry – first captured: 1975 † (Only known surviving Fiordland Kakapo to breed)
 Rob – † 
 Sass – † 
 Smoko – first captured: 1991† 
 Stumpy – hatched: 1991
 Waynebo †
 Whiskas – first captured: 1989 †

Living kākāpō 
The list below is not complete as it excludes most of the birds from the 2022 breeding season. As of February 2022, the names are in the process of being announced.

Females

Adelaide – hatched: 2016; mother: Kuia, father: Kumi.
Aella – hatched: 2022; mother: Boomer, father: Te Kingi.
Ahu – hatched: 2022; mother: Marian, father: Te Kingi.
Ᾱio – hatched: 2019; mother: Mila, father: Horton.
Ako – hatched: 2019; mother: Esperance, father: Kōmaru.
Alice – first captured: 1981; mother of Snark '81, Manu '97; Al, Pearl '02, Huarangi, Vori, Whetū '19, Rūpi '22.
Alison – hatched: 2019; mother: Queenie, father: Tutoko.
Aparima – hatched: 2002; mother: Wendy, father: Waynebo; mother of JEM '08, Bunker, Chicory, Sage, Horopito '19, Lilibet, Phantom, Rosemary '22.
Aranga – hatched: 1999; mother: Lisa, father: Ox; mother of Jack '09, Waikawa '11, Percy, Clout '16.
Āria – hatched: 2019; mother: Awarua, father: Kōmaru.
Atareta – hatched: 2011; mother: Lisa, father: Blades; mother of Manaaki, Atatu, Whaea Jane '19, Rōria, Pūkāea, Ata Rangi '22.
Atatū – hatched 2019; mother: Atareta, father: Te Kingi.
Avé – hatched 2022; mother: Konini, father: Kumi.
Aumaria – hatched: 2016; mother: Stella, father: Blake.
Awarua – hatched: 2009; mother: Kuihi, father: Barnard; mother of Motupōhue, Āria, Matariki '19, Ngaio, Hector, Joy '22.
Āwhina – hatched 2022; mother: JEM, father: Waihōpai.
Bella – first captured: 1982; mother of Tiaka, Hillary, Roha '09, Verity '19.
Boomer – hatched: 1999; mother: Zephyr, father: Felix; mother of  Deans, Hau, Marangai '19, Aella, Merekara '22.
Cyndy – first captured: 1987; mother of Horton '02; Weheruatanga-o-te-po, Elwin, Jester '08; Ngatapa, Queenie '09.
Dusky – hatched: 2016; mother: Tiwhiri, father: Horton.
Elsie – hatched: 2019; mother: Waikawa, father: Horton.
Esperance – hatched: 2002; mother: Flossie, father: Bill; mother of Huhana '09, Ako, Matakana, Toiora '19.
Eva  – hatched: 2019; mother: Suzanne, father: Gulliver.
Evohe – hatched: 2009; mother: Zephyr, father: Felix; mother of Pōtonga, Kōhengi '19, Norm, Hautoka, Tōrua '22.
Flossie – first captured: by 1982; mother of Heather '81; Kuia, Gulliver, Sinbad '98; Rakiura, Esperance '02; Yasmine, Pura '05; Wiremu, Scratch '09; Hakatere, Waa '11.
Galaxy – hatched: 2019; Mother: Ihi, father Guapo.
Gale – hatched: 2019; Mother: Nora, father Tutoko.
Gertrude – hatched: 2016; mother: Kuia, father: Blake; mother of Paritū, Ursula '22.
Hakatere – hatched: 2011; mother: Flossie, father: Barnard.
Hananui – hatched: 2002; mother: Lisa, father: Blades; mother of Wharetutu, Wolf '09.
Hanariki – hatched: 2019; mother: Pura, father: Te Atapo.
Hau – hatched: 2019; mother: Boomer, father: Tamahou.
Hauturu – hatched: 1999; mother: Lisa, father: Ox.
Heather – hatched: 1981; mother: Flossie, father: Ben; mother of Palmersan, Robbie '02; Guapo, Awhero '09; Mahli, Tohu '14.
Hera – hatched: 2016; mother Suzanne, father Arab.
Hine Taumai – hatched: 2002; mother: Wendy, father: Waynebo; mother of Te Here, Tuterangi, Tītapu '16, Olive '22.
Hinemoa – hatched: 2009; mother: Sue, father: Basil; mother of Ranger, Whakakini '19.
Huarangi – hatched: 2019, mother: Alice, father: Boss.
Huhū – Hatched: 2019; mother: Huhana, father: Guapo.
Jean – first captured: 1981; mother of Blake, Kuihi, Te Kingi '02.
Joy – hatched: 2022, mother: Awarua, father: Kōmaru.
JEM – hatched: 2008; mother: Aparima, father: Bill; mother of Āwhina '22.
Kōhengi – hatched: 2019, mother: Evohe, father: Te Kingi.
Konini – hatched: 2002; mother: Fuchsia, father: Waynebo; mother of Hugh '16, Paroro, Avé, Thrum '22.
Kuia – hatched: 1998; mother: Flossie, father: Richard Henry; mother of Gertrude, Marian, Adelaide, Henry '16, Acheron, Mackenzie, Quill '19.
Kuihi – hatched: 2002; mother: Jean, father: Sass; mother of Awarua, Waihopai, Hokonui '09, Oraka '16, Koru, Māhutonga '19.
Kura – hatched: 2016; mother: Tumeke, father Boss.
Lilibet - hatched: 2022; mother: Aparima, father: Basil.
Lisa – first captured: by August 1982; mother of Ellie, Hauturu, Aranga '99; Hananui '02; Tiwhiri, Hurihuri, Purity '09; Atareta '11; Ruapuke '14 (Presumed lost on Little Barrier Island for 13 years; rediscovered on a nest in 1999.) (Encounter with Stephen Fry and Mark Carwardine described in Last Chance to See.) (Likely also the mother of Merty and Joe).
Luna – hatched: 2022; mother: Stella, father: Horton.
Madeline – hatched: 2022; mother: Margaret-Maree, father Sinbad (by artificial insemination).
Madison – hatched: 2019; mother: Waikawa, father Horton.
Mahli – hatched: 2014; mother: Heather, father: Dobbie.
Makorea – hatched: 2016; mother: Waikawa, father Kumi.
Marama – hatched: 2002; mother: Margaret-Maree, father: Nog; Mother of Hikoi, Porowhita, Tūtānekai '19.
Margaret-Maree – first captured: 1986; mother of Marama, Mila, Monoa '02; Kumi '05; Millie, Moss '09, Madeline (by artificial insemination) '22 (Likely the mother of Sarah and Wendy).
Marian – hatched: 2016; mother: Kuia, father: Kumi; mother of Ahu, Cascade, Matilda '22.
Matilda – hatched: 2022; mother: Marian, father: Te Kingi.
Mati-Mā – hatched: 2019; mother: Rakiura, father: Kōmaru.
Merekara – hatched: 2022; mother: Boomer, father: Te Kingi.
Moana – hatched 2022; mother: Pearl, father: Boss.
Mukeke – hatched: 2016; mother: Waa, father: Blake.
Ngaio – hatched: 2022; mother: Awarua, father: Kōmaru.
Ninihi – hatched: 2016; mother: Stella, father: Blake.
Nora – first captured: 1980; mother of Zephyr, Adler '81; Matangi, Kotiu '16, Gale, Kōraki, Rahotu (by artificial insemination) '19.
Olive  – hatched 2022; mother: Hine Taumai, father: Tamahou.
Ongaonga - hatched: 2022; mother: Waa, father: Ariki
Owha - hatched: 2022; mother: Ra, father Hokonui.
Pākiki - hatched: 2022; mother: Toitiiti, father: Basil.
Paritū - hatched: 2022; mother: Gertrude, father: Ariki.
Pearl – hatched: 2002; mother: Alice, father: Waynebo; mother of Juanma, Jemma '09; Punga, Attenborough, Faulkner '16, Tuarua '19, Mātāmua, Mokonui, Moana '22.
Phoenix – hatched: 2019; mother: Waikawa, father: Horton.
Pounamu – hatched: 2005; mother: Sara, father: Waynebo.
Pura – hatched: 2005; mother: Flossie, father: Bill; mother of: Bravo, Hanariki, Uri '19, Stefan '22.
Queenie – hatched: 2009; mother: Cyndy, father: Ox; mother of Alison, Scotty '19, Willans '22.
Rakiura – hatched: 2002; mother: Flossie, father: Bill; mother of Toititi '08; Tamahou, Tiaho, Te Atapo '09; Taonga, Tia, Tutoko '11; Taeatanga, Te Awa '14, Mati-Mā, Tautahi '19.
Rātā – hatched: 2019; mother: Ruth, father: Juanma.
Rere – hatched: 2019; mother: Roha, father: Takitimu.
Rimu – hatched: 2016; mother: Wendy; father Boss.
Roha – hatched: 2009; mother: Bella, father: Blades; mother of Kewa, Rere '19.
Rosemary – hatched: 2022; mother: Aparima, father: Basil.
Ruth – first captured: 1991; mother of Doc '02, Tukaha '16, Rātā '19, Kevin '22 (by artificial insemination). (She is blind in one eye).
Solstice – first captured: 21 June 1997; mother of Ra '09; Ihi, Kōmaru, Stella '11, Valerie, Manakouri '22 (Last bird captured from Stewart Island / Rakiura).
Stella – hatched: 2011; mother: Solstice, father: Waynebo; mother of Ninihi, Kokoto, Aumaria '16; Kenneth, Manawanui, Orion '19, Luna, Uenuku, Ururangi '22.
Sue – first captured: 1983; mother of Takitimu '02; Rooster '08; George, Hinemoa '09; Elliot, Ruggedy '16.
Suzanne – first captured 1989; mother of Ian '11, Egilsay, Hera '16, Milford, Fergus, Eva '19.
Tangiwai – hatched: 2022; mother: Tohu, father: Sinbad (by artificial insemination).
Tia – hatched: 2011; mother: Rakiura, father: Barnard.
Tiaka – hatched: 2009; mother: Bella, father: Blades.
Tītapu – hatched: 2016; mother: Hine Taumai, father: Takitimu; mother of Tuarima, Bloxham '22.
Tiwhiri – hatched: 2009; mother: Lisa, father: Basil; mother of Dusky '16, Tōmua, Tūmanako '19.
Tohu – hatched: 2014; mother: Heather, father: Dobbie, mother of Kaiako, Tangiwai '22.
Toiora – hatched: 2019; mother: Esperance, father: Kōmaru.
Toitiiti – hatched: 2008; mother: Rakiura, father: Ox; mother of Pākiki '22
Tōrua – hatched: 2022; mother: Evohe, father Manu.
Tuarua – hatched: 2019, mother: Pearl, father: Boss.
Tukaha – hatched: 2016; mother: Ruth, father: Blades.
Tumeke – hatched: 2002; mother: Wendy, father: Waynebo; mother of Kura, Kanawera, Tau Kuhurangi '16, Big Nick, Meri, Tutū '19, Tā Tipene, Mason '22.
Tūruapō - hatched: 2022; mother: Weheruatanga-o-te-po, father: Merv (by artificial insemination).
Uenuku - hatched: 2022; mother: Stella, father: Horton.
Ursula - hatched: 2022; mother: Gertrude, father: Ariki.
Ururangi - hatched 2022; mother: Stella, father: Horton.
Valerie – hatched: 2022; mother: Solstice, father Gulliver.
Verity – hatched: 2019; mother: Bella, father: Juanma.
Vori – hatched: 2019; mother: Alice, father: Boss.
Waa – hatched: 2011; mother: Flossie, father: Barnard; mother of Mukeke '16, Ōtepoti '19, Tuterakipaua, Ongaonga '22.
Waikawa – hatched: 2011; mother: Aranga, father: Blades; mother of Makorea '16, Elsie, Kohitatea, Kotahitanga, Madison, Phoenix '19, Kawa, Wai '22.
Weheruatanga-o-te-po – hatched: 2008; mother: Cyndy, father: Ox; mother of Tūruapō (by artificial insemination), Andy (by artificial insemination) '22.
Wendy – first captured:1982; mother of Dobbie '91; Aparima, Hine Taumai, Tumeke '02; Jamieson, Rimu '16.
Whaea Jane – hatched: 2019; mother: Atareta, father: Te Kingi.
Whetū – hatched: 2019; mother: Alice, father: Boss.
Yasmine – hatched: 2005; mother: Flossie, father: Bill.
Zephyr – hatched: 1981; mother: Nora, father: Rangi; mother of Hoki '92; Sirocco, Tiwai '97; Trevor, Boomer '99; Maestro, Evohe '09, Sushil (by artificial insemination), Lierz (by artificial insemination) '22.

Males

Acheron – hatched: 2019; mother: Kuia, father: Tamahou.
Andy – hatched: 2022; mother: Weheruatanga-o-te-po, father: Merv (by artificial insemination).
Apollo – hatched: 2022; mother: Ra, father: Hokonui.
Ariki – hatched: 2002; mother: Sara, father: Waynebo, father of Tuterakipaua, Ongaonga, Paritū, Ursula '22.
Ata Rangi – hatched: 2022; mother: Atareta, father: Te Kingi.
Attenborough – hatched: 2016; mother: Pearl, father Felix.
Awhero – hatched: 2009; mother: Heather, father: Blades.
Basil – first captured 1989; father of Doc, Takitimu '02; Rooster '08; Hinemoa, George, Tiwhiri, Purity, Hurihuri '09 Bunker, Chicory, Sage, Horopito '19, Pākiki, Phantom, Lilibet, Rosemary '22.
Big Nick – hatched: 2019; mother: Tumeke, Father: Boss.
Blades – first captured 1982; father of Hananui '02; Awhero, Tiaka, Hillary, Roha, Jack, Guapo '09; Atareta, Waikawa '11; Ruapuke,  Taeatanga, Te Awa, Moorhouse '14; Kotiu, Matangi, Ruggedy, Elliot, Tukaha, Oraka '16.
Bloxham – hatched: 2022; mother: Tītapu, father Gulliver.
Bluster-Murphy – hatched: 2009; mother: Fuchsia, father: Smoko.
Bonus – Found in April 1984.
Boss – first captured 1989, father of Kura, Kanawera, Tau Kuhurangi, Jamieson '16, Big Nick, Tuarua, Meri, Huarangi, Vori, Whetū '19, Mātāmua, Mokonui, Moana, Rūpi '22.
Bravo – hatched: 2019; mother: Pura, father: Te Atapo.
Bunker – hatched: 2019; mother: Aparima, father: Basil.
Cascade – hatched: 2022; mother: Marian, father: Te Kingi.
Chicory – hatched: 2019; mother: Aparima, father: Basil.
Clout – hatched: 2016; mother: Aranga, father Smoko.
Deans – hatched: 2019; mother: Boomer, father: Tamahou.
Egilsay – hatched: 2016; mother Suzanne, father Arab; originally named Elsie until genetic testing confirmed he was male.
Elliot – hatched: 2016; mother: Sue, father: Blades.
Elwin – hatched: 2008; mother: Cyndy, father: Ox.
Faulkner – hatched: 2016; mother: Pearl, father: Felix.
Fergus – hatched: 2019; mother: Suzanne, father: Gulliver.
George – hatched: 2009; mother: Sue, father: Basil.
Guapo – hatched: 2009; mother: Heather, father: Blades; father of Galaxy, Hondy, Huhu '19, Stefan '22.
Gulliver – hatched: 1998; mother: Flossie; father: Richard Henry; father of Milford, Fergus, Eva '19, Valerie, Manakouri, Tuarima, Bloxham '22.
Hautoka – hatched: 2022; mother: Evohe, father: Manu.
Hector – hatched: 2022; mother: Awarua, father: Kōmaru.
Henry – hatched: 2016; mother: Kuia, father: Kumi (first Grandson of Richard Henry).
Hīkoi – hatched: 2019; mother Marama, father: Takitimu.
Hillary – hatched: 2009; mother: Bella, father: Blades.
Hokonui – hatched: 2009; mother: Kuihi, father: Barnard; father of: Xena '19, Xenicus, Owha, Apollo '22.
Hondy – hatched: 2019; mother Ihi, father: Guapo.
Horopito – hatched: 2019; mother: Aparima, father: Basil.
Horton – hatched: 2002; mother: Cyndy, father: Bill; father of Dusky '16, Ᾱio, Elsie, Kohitatea, Kotahitanga, Lind, Madison, Major, Phoenix, Ranger, Whakakini '19, Luna, Uenuku, Ururangi '22
Hugh – hatched: 2016; mother: Konini, father: Blake.
Hurihuri – hatched: 2009; mother: Lisa, father: Basil; father of Willans '22.
Ian – hatched: 2011; mother: Suzanne, father: Luke.
Jack – hatched: 2009; mother: Aranga, father: Blades.
Jamieson – hatched: 2016; mother: Wendy, father: Boss.
Joe – First captured: 1982, he is infertile.
Kaiako – hatched: 2022; mother: Tohu, father Sinbad (by artificial insemination).
Kanawera – hatched: 2016; mother: Tumeke, father Boss.
Kawa – hatched 2022; mother: Waikawa, father: Te Kingi.
Kenneth – hatched: 2019; mother Stella, father: Te Kingi.
Kevin – hatched: 2022; mother Ruth, father: Merv (by artificial insemination).
Kewa – hatched: 2019; mother: Roha, father: Takitimu.
Kohitātea – hatched: 2019; mother Waikawa, father: Horton.
Kokoto – hatched: 2016; mother: Stella, father: Blake.
Kōmaru – hatched: 2011; mother: Solstice, father: Waynebo; father of Ako, Āria, Māhutonga, Mati-Mā, Matariki, Matakana, Motupōhue, Tautahi, Toiora '19, Ngaio, Hector, Joy '22.
Kōraki – hatched: 2019; mother: Nora, father: Tutoko.
Kotahitanga – hatched: 2019; mother: Waikawa, father: Horton.
Kumi – hatched: 2005; mother: Margaret-Maree, father: Sass; father of Henry, Marian, Adelaide, Makorea '16, Paroro, Avé, Thrum '22.
Lierz – hatched: 2022; mother Zephyr, father: Luke (by artificial insemination).
Lind – hatched: 2019; mother Jemma, father: Horton.
Luke – found in April 1982; father of Ian '11, Sushil (by artificial insemination), Lierz (by artificial insemination) '22.
Mackenzie – hatched: 2019; mother: Kuia, father: Tamahou.
Maestro – hatched: 2009; mother: Zephyr, father: Felix.
Māhutonga – hatched: 2019; mother: Kuihi, father: Kōmaru.
Major  – hatched: 2019; mother: Mila, father: Horton.
Manaaki – hatched: 2019; mother: Atareta, father: Te Kingi.
Manakouri – hatched: 2022; mother: Solstice, father: Gulliver.
Manawanui – hatched: 2019; mother: Stella, father: Te Kingi. 
Marangai – hatched: 2019; mother: Boomer, father: Tamahou.
Mātāmua – hatched 2022; mother: Pearl, father: Boss.
Mason – hatched: 2022; mother: Tumeke, father Stumpy.
Matangi – hatched: 2016; mother: Nora, father Blades.
Meri – hatched: 2019; mother: Tumeke, father: Boss.
Merv – found in January 1989; father of Tūruapō (by artificial insemination), Andy (by artificial insemination), Kevin (by artificial insemination) '22.
Milford – hatched: 2019, mother: Suzanne, father: Gulliver.
Mokonui – hatched: 2022; mother: Pearl, father: Boss.
Moorhouse – hatched: 2014; mother: Huhana, father: Blades.
Morehu – hatched: 1999; mother: Sandra, father: Felix.
Moss – hatched: 2009; mother: Magaret-Maree, father: Merty.
Motupōhue – hatched: 2019; mother: Awarua, father: Kōmaru.
Ngatapa – hatched: 2009; mother: Cyndy, father: Ox.
Nog – first captured: 1989; father of Mila, Monoa, Marama '02.
Norm - hatched: 2022; mother: Evohe; father: Manu.
Oraka – hatched: 2016; mother: Kuihi, father: Blades.
Orion – hatched: 2019; mother: Stella, father: Te Kingi.
Ōtepoti – hatched: 2019; mother: Waa, father: Takitimu.
Ox – first captured: 1982; father of Aranga, Ellie, Hauturu '99; Toititi, Elwin, Wheruatanga-o-te-po, Jester '08; Ngatapa, Queenie '09.
Paddy – hatched: 2009; mother: Sara, father: Manu.
Palmersan – hatched: 2002; mother: Heather, father: Sass.
Paroro – hatched: 2022; mother: Konini, father: Kumi.
Percy – hatched: 2016; mother: Aranga, father: Smoko.
Porowhita – hatched: 2019; mother: Marama, father: Takitimu.
Pūkāea – hatched: 2022; mother: Atareta, father: Te Kingi.
Quill – hatched 2019; mother: Kuia, father: Tamahou.
Rahotu – hatched 2019; mother: Nora, father: Sinbad (by Artificial Insemination).
Ralph – first captured: 1987 (Encounter with Douglas Adams and Mark Carwardine described in Last Chance to See), (Likely the father of Merty).
Ranger – hatched: 2019; mother: Hinemoa, father: Horton.
Rangi – first captured: 1987; father of Zephyr '81 (Rediscovered February 2009, after hiding for 21 years on Codfish Island) (likely also the father of Sarah and Wendy).
Robbie – hatched: 2002; mother: Heather, father: Sass.
Rōria - hatched: 2022; mother: Atareta, father: Te Kingi
Ruapuke – hatched: 2014; mother: Lisa, father: Blades (Formerly known as Lisa One; egg was crushed and repaired during incubation period.).
Ruggedy – hatched: 2016; mother Sue, father Blades.
Rūpi – hatched: 2022; mother Alice, father Boss.
Sage – hatched: 2019; mother: Aparima, father: Basil.
Scotty – hatched: 2019; mother: Queenie, father: Tutoko.
Scratch – hatched: 2009; mother: Flossie, father: Whiskas.
Sinbad – hatched: 1998; mother: Flossie, father: Richard Henry; father of: Rahotu (by artificial insemination) '19, Madeline (by artificial insemination), Kaiako (by artificial insemination), Tangiwai (by artificial insemination) '22. He is semi-imprinted, and likes to seek out human company. Andrew Digby via Twitter, 10 October 2018.
Sirocco – hatched: 1997; mother: Zephyr, father: Felix (Unlikely to be used to breed. Encounter with Stephen Fry and Mark Carwardine described in Last Chance to See).
Stefan – hatched: 2022; mother: Pura, father: Guapo.
Stumpy – hatched: 1991; mother: John-Girl, father: Pegasus; father of Jemma (by artificial insemination), Juanma (by artificial insemination) '09, Tā Tipene, Mason '22.
Sushil – hatched: 2022; mother: Zephyr, father: Luke (by artificial insemination).
Tā Tipene – hatched: 2022; mother: Tumeke, father: Stumpy.
Taeatanga – hatched: 2014; mother: Rakiura, father: Blades.
Takitimu – hatched: 2002; mother: Sue, father: Basil; father of Te Here, Tuterangi, Tītapu '16; Tōmua, Tūmanako, Ōtepoti, Kewa, Rere, Hikoi, Porowhita, Tūtānekai '19.
Tamahou – hatched: 2009; mother: Rakiura, father: Whiskas; father of Acheron, Deans, Hau, Mackenzie, Marangai, Quill '19, Olive '22.
Tau Kuhurangi – hatched: 2016; mother: Tumeke, father Boss
Tautahi – hatched: 2019; mother: Rakiura, father: Kōmaru.
Te Atapo – hatched: 2009; mother: Rakiura, father: Whiskas; father of Bravo, Hanariki, Tutū, Uri '19.
Te Awa – hatched: 2014; mother: Rakiura, father: Blades.
Te Here – hatched: 2016; mother: Hine Taumai, father: Takitimu.
Te Kingi – hatched: 2002; mother: Jean, father: Sass; father of Atatū, Kenneth, Kohengi, Manaaki, Manawanui, Orion, Pōtonga, Whaea Jane '19, Kawa, Wai, Ahu, Cascade, Matilda, Rōria, Pūkāea, Ata Rangi, Aella, Merekara '22.
Thrum – hatched: 2022; mother: Konini, father: Kumi.
Tiwai – hatched: 1997; mother: Zephyr, father: Felix.
Tōmua – hatched: 2019; mother: Tiwhiri, father: Takitimu.
Trevor – hatched: 1999; mother: Zephyr, father: Felix.
Tuarima – hatched: 2022; mother: Tītapu, father: Gulliver.
Tūmanako – hatched: 2019; mother: Tiwhiri, father Takitimu.
Tūtānekai – hatched: 2019, mother: Marama, father: Takitimu.
Tuterakipaua - hatched: 2022; mother: Waa, father: Ariki
Tuterangi – hatched: 2016; mother: Hine Taumai, father: Takitimu.
Tutoko – hatched: 2011; mother: Rakiura, father: Barnard; father of Gale, Kōraki, Koru, Scotty, Alison '19.
Wai - hatched 2022; mother: Waikawa, father: Te Kingi.
Waihōpai – hatched: 2009; mother: Kuihi, father: Barnard; father of Āwhina '22.
Whakakini – hatched: 2019; mother: Hinemoa, Father: Horton.
Willans – hatched: 2022; mother: Queenie, Father: Hurihuri. First chick ever born on Te Kakahu/Chalky Island.
Wiremu – hatched: 2009; mother: Flossie, father: Whiskas.
Wolf – hatched: 2009; mother: Hananui, father: Merty.
Xenicus – hatched: 2022; mother: Ra, father: Hokonui.

Fundraising
To raise money for research, the New Zealand government's Department of Conservation operates a kākāpō adoption scheme. Adoptions are not exclusive; multiple people can adopt the same bird. Adoption is symbolic – kākāpō are a taonga (treasured) species, so no one can 'own' one. Adoption supports funding for kākāpō health management, supplementary food and annual transmitter changes.

Recently deceased
Names marked ‡ are of birds missing, presumed dead

Females
Mike‡ – Found in April 1982 on Stewart Island / Rakiura by Gary Aburn and the dog Mandy, transferred to Little Barrier Island a month later. Her transmitter failed in 1982 and she has been missing since then. She was possibly seen in 2015. However, a search could not locate her.
John-Girl – mother of Stumpy '91; died: September 1991
Aroha – hatched: 2002; mother: Sue; died: July 2004
Aurora – hatched: 2002; mother: Zephyr; died: July 2004
Vollie – hatched: 2002; mother: Ruth; died: July 2004
Mokopuna – hatched 2008; mother: Rakiura, father: Ox; died: 2008
Sarah – mother of Ariki '02; Pounamu '05; Paddy '09; died: May 2010
Purity – hatched: 2009; mother: Lisa, father: Basil; died: September 2011
Monoa – hatched: 2002; mother: Margaret-Maree, father: Nog; died: September 2011
Sandra – mother of Morehu '99; died January 2012
Fuchsia – first captured: 1991; mother of Konini '02; Bluster-Murphy '09; died: March 2013
Taonga – hatched: 2011; mother: Rakiura, father: Barnard; died: April 2014
Maggie – first captured: March 1980; died: May 2014, in a landslide (the second female captured on Stewart Island)
Ellie – hatched: 1999; mother: Lisa, father: Ox; died: July 2015 
Wharetutu – hatched: 2009; mother: Hananui, father: Merty[16], died 2016
Jane – first captured 1989, found dead on Anchor Island, 18 August 2018 
Hoki – hatched: 1992; mother: Zephyr, father: Felix (the first hand raised bird; subject of a book by her caretaker), died. 21 April 2019 from aspergillosis.
Huhana – hatched: 2009; mother: Esperance, father: Whiskas; mother of Moorhouse '14, Huhu '19 (Youngest breeding female ever with 5 years)[18], died 23 May 2019 from aspergillosis.
Mila – hatched: 2002; mother: Margaret-Maree, father: Nog; mother of Ᾱio, Major '19; found dead on Anchor Island, 21 May 2020.
Matariki – hatched 2019; mother: Awarua, father: Komaru. Found dead on Whenua Hou on 27 November 2020.
Matakana – hatched: 2019; mother: Esperance, father Komaru. Found dead on Whenua Hou in February 2021.
Tutū – hatched: 2019; mother: Tumeke, father: Te Atapo. Found dead 2021.
Millie – hatched: 2009; mother: Margaret-Maree, father: Merty. Found dead on Te Kakahu (Chalky Island) on 21 April 2021.
Ihi – hatched: 2011; mother: Solstice, father: Waynebo; mother of: Galaxy, Hondy '19. Found dead on Whenua Hou in June 2021.
Xena – hatched 2019; mother: Ra, father: Hokonui. Found dead on Whenua Hou in June 2021.
Jemma – hatched: 2009; mother: Pearl, father: Stumpy (by artificial insemination); mother of Lind '19. Died 15 March 2022, likely from aspergillosis.
Ra – hatched: 2009; mother: Solstice, father: Smoko (by artificial insemination); mother of: Xena '19, Owha, Xenicus, Apollo '22. Found dead on Anchor Island on 22 March 2022.
Punga‡ – hatched: 2016; mother: Pearl, father: Felix. Presumed dead after being missing for over five years.

Males
Adler‡ – missing on Stewart island since 1981 (presumed killed by cats): hatched 1981; mother Nora, father Rangi
Tawbert‡ – missing in the Transit Valley since 1987, one of three Fiordland males known to have survived until then. May still be alive as booming was heard in the Transit in 2012.
Biscuit ‡ – missing presumed dead, one of three Fiordland males known to have survived until 1987. (Discovered on the Tutoko high bench in Fiordland in 1984). 
Snark‡ – missing on Little Barrier Island since 1990: hatched 1981; mother Alice, father Buster
Gunter‡ – missing on Codfish Island / Whenua Hou since 1987. (Found on Stewart Island / Rakiura in October 1981).
Pierre‡ – missing on Codfish Island / Whenua Hou since 1988
Tramp‡ – missing on Codfish Island / Whenua Hou since 1988
Al‡ – missing on Codfish Island / Whenua Hou since 2010: hatched: 2002; mother: Alice, father: Waynebo
Gerry – died: 1991
Pegasus – father of Stumpy '91; died: 1993
Rob – died: February 1994 
Ken – first captured: 1988; died: July 1998 (transmitter harness injury)
Gunner – died: winter 2005
Bill – first captured: 1982; father of Dobbie '91; Esperance, Horton, Rakiura '02; Pura, Yasmine '05; JEM '08; died: March 2008
Lee – died: 28 October 2008
Sass – father of Robbie, Palmersan, Te Kingi, Blake, Kuihi '02; Kumi '05; died: February 2010 
Richard Henry – first captured: 1975; father of Gulliver, Kuia, Sinbad '98; found dead: 24 December 2010 (The last bird from the South Island, he was captured by Don Merton, John Cheyne, and Mandy dog in 1975 in Fiordland National Park/Gulliver Valley/Esperance River, named after Richard Treacy Henry)
Whiskas – first captured: 1989; father of Tamahou, Tiaho, Te Atapo, Wiremu, Huhana, Scratch '09; died: January 2011
Waynebo – father of Ariki, Konini, Pearl, Al, Tumeke, Hine Taumai, Aparima '02; Pounamu '05; Ihi, Komaru, Stella '11; died: January 2012
Rooster – hatched: 2008; mother: Sue, father: Basil; died: March 2012
Barnard – first captured: 1982; father of Awarua, Waihopai, Hokonui '09; Hakatere, Taonga, Tia, Tutoko, Waa '11; died: April 2012
Ben – father of Heather '81; died: April 2014
Lionel – first captured: 1981 (likely was a juvenile at the time); died: June 2014
Smoko – first captured: 1991; father of Bluster-Murphy, Ra (by artificial insemination) '09; Clout, Percy '16; died: February 2016
Tiaho – hatched: 2009; mother: Rakiura, father: Whiskas: died March 2016 from fight.
Blake – hatched: 2002; mother: Jean, father: Sass; father of Hugh, Mukeke, Ninihi, Kokoto, Aumaria, Gertrude '16 Died: December 2017 from heat stress.
Jimmy – Died: December 2017 from complications following an anesthetic procedure.
Kotiu – hatched: 2016; mother Nora, father Blades – Died: February 2018
Dobbie – hatched: 1991; mother: Wendy, father: Bill; father of Mahli, Tohu '14 – Died: 12 March 2018
Piripi – caught in January 1990. Died ca. 3 January 2019 of injuries consistent with fighting, possibly inflicted by Ngātapa.
Arab – first captured by Gary 'Arab' Aburn in 1980; father of Egilsay, Hera '16, Died 2 May 2019 from complications relating to an eye injury.
Gumboots – first captured: 1988, died 3 May 2019 after getting his leg trapped in a forked branch on Whenua Hou and not being able to free himself.
Merty – Hatched: unknown; mother: Lisa, father: Ralph; father of Wolf, Moss, Millie, Wharetutu '09. Declared dead. 21 May 2019, not seen for 5 years
Felix – first captured: 1989; father of Hoki, Tiwai, Sirocco, Manu '97; Boomer, Morehu, Trevor '99; Maestro, Evohe '09, Attenborough, Punga, Faulkner '16. Died September 2019 on Little Barrier Island
Koru – hatched: 2019; mother: Kuihi, father: Tutoko; found dead on Whenua Hou 5 August 2020.
Pōtonga – hatched: 2019; mother: Evohe, father: Te Kingi. Found dead on Anchor Island in February 2021.
Uri – hatched: 2019; mother: Pura, father: Te Atapo. Found dead on Whenua Hou in March 2021.
Jester – hatched: 2008; mother: Cyndy, father: Ox. Found dead on Little Barrier Island in April 2022
Juanma – hatched: 2009; mother: Pearl, father: Stumpy (by artificial insemination); father of Verity, Rātā '19. Found dead in April 2022
Doc – hatched: 2002; mother: Ruth, father: Basil. Found dead on Hauturu-O-Toi/Little Barrier Island in January 2023.
Manu – hatched: 1997; mother: Alice, father: Felix; father of Paddy '09, Norm, Hautoka, Tōrua '22. Found dead on Anchor Island in January 2023.
Phantom – hatched: 2022; mother: Aparima, father: Basil. Found dead in February 2023 (he had a badly damaged beak and was the first named chick of 2022 breeding season to die).

Birds with Fiordland genetics 
All kakapo with Fiordland genetics descend from Richard Henry.

Names marked † are of birds deceased

 † Richard Henry - male captured 1975; Father, grandfather or great-grandfather to all kakapo with Fiordland genetics. Found deceased 24 December 2010
 Gulliver - male hatched 1998; mother: Flossie; father: Richard Henry.
 Sinbad - male hatched 1998; mother: Flossie; father: Richard Henry.
 Kuia - female hatched 1998; mother: Flossie; father: Richard Henry.
 Gertrude - female hatched 2016; mother: Kuia, father: Blake.
 Marian - female hatched 2016; mother: Kuia, father: Kumi.
 Adelaide - female hatched 2016; mother: Kuia, father: Kumi.
 Henry - male hatched 2016; mother: Kuia, father: Kumi.
 Milford - male hatched 2019; mother: Suzanne, father: Gulliver.
 Fergus - male hatched 2019; mother: Suzanne, father: Gulliver.
 Eva - female hatched 2019; mother: Suzanne, father: Gulliver.
 Acheron - male hatched 2019; mother: Kuia, father: Tamahou.
 Mackenzie - male hatched 2019; mother: Kuia, father: Tamahou.
 Quill - male hatched 2019; mother: Kuia, father: Tamahou.
 Rahotu - male hatched 2019; mother: Nora, father: Sinbad (by artificial insemination).
 Ahu - female hatched 2022; mother: Marian, father: Te Kingi.
 Cascade - male hatched 2022; mother: Marian, father: Te Kingi.
 Matilda - female hatched 2022; mother: Marian, father: Te Kingi.
 Valerie - female hatched 2022; mother: Solstice, father: Gulliver.
 Paritū - female hatched 2022; mother: Gertrude, father: Ariki.
 Manakou - male hatched 2022; mother: Solstice, father: Gulliver.
 Ursula - female hatched 2022; mother: Gertrude, father: Ariki.
 Madeline - female hatched 2022; mother: Margaret-Maree, father: Sinbad (by artificial insemination).
Tuarima – male hatched: 2022; mother: Tītapu, Gulliver.
Kaiako – male hatched: 2022; mother: Tohu, father Sinbad (by artificial insemination).
Bloxham – male hatched: 2022; mother: Tītapu, Gulliver.
Tangiwai – female hatched: 2022; mother: Tohu, father: Sinbad (by artificial insemination).

References

Further reading
Ballance, Alison. (2018). Kakapo. Rescued from the brink of extinction. Nelson: Potton & Burton. 276 pages. . https://www.pottonandburton.co.nz/store/kakapo-2018 Appendix 1: "Kakapo names" (pp 242–265) is an alphabetical list of all known 233 adult kākāpō, with brief info on each bird (alive or dead).

External links
 Kākāpō Recovery Programme

Lists of birds
Critically endangered animals
'
Strigopidae